Acentrella inexpectata is a species of small minnow mayfly in the family Baetidae. It is found in Europe and Northern Asia (excluding China).

References

Mayflies
Insects described in 1928